Hadar (also spelled Qad daqar, Qadaqar; Afar "white [qidi] stream [daqar]") is a paleontological site in Mille district, Administrative Zone 1 of the Afar Region, Ethiopia, 15 km upstream (west) of the A1 road's bridge across the Awash River (Adayitu kebele).

It is situated on the southern edge of the Afar Triangle (part of East Africa's Great Rift Valley), along the left banks of the Awash River, between two minor tributaries, the eponymous Kada Hadar and the Kada Gona. In 1972, Taieb organized a small exploratory reconnaissance of the Afar region to investigate more paleontological finds there. After six weeks of exploration, the party focused on the Hadar site.

The site has yielded some of the most well-known hominin fossils, including "Lucy". These hominin fossils range in age from approximately 3.42 to 2.90 million years ago. These finds give us a greater understanding of hominin evolution during this period.

It is postulated that the specimens in the region were deposited by way of a large river system with associated crevasse channels/splays, deltas, and distributary channels, as well as periodic transgressions of paleolake Hadar located east of the research area (Aronson and Taieb, 1981, Tiercelin, 1986, Campisano and Feibel, in press) possibly related to geological activity or climatic cycles in at least the Kada Hadar Member (Yemane et al., 1996, Yemane, 1997, Campisano and Feibel, in press)."

According to Jon Kalb, early maps show caravan routes passing within 10 to 15 km of Hadar but not through it. The British explorer L.M. Nesbitt passed 15 km west of Hadar in 1928.

Geology 

The region's rocks consist mainly of mudstones, siltstones, fine-grained sandstones and volcanic tuffs. The region has been divided into four geologic members—Hadar Formation, Basal (∼3.8–3.42 Ma), Sidi Hakoma (∼3.42–3.26 Ma), Denen Dora (∼3.26–3.2 Ma) and Kada Hadar (<∼3.2 Ma)—with three tuffs (Sidi Hakoma Tuff [SHT], Triple Tuff [TT] and Kada Hadar Tuff [KHT]) separating the four members.

The Sidi Hakoma member tends towards high rainfall and low seasonality. The overlying Denan Dora Member was a grassland habitat. Finally, the Kada Hadar Member was an even more open and arid habitat, as seen in the high abundance of antilopines, which frequent these types of terrains.

Paleontology
The first paleo-geological explorations of the Hadar area were conducted by Maurice Taieb. He found Hadar in December 1970 by following the Ledi River, which originates in the highlands north of Bati to empty into the Awash River. Taieb recovered several fossils in the area and led a party back to Hadar in May 1972. In October 1973, 16 individuals with the International Afar Research Expedition (IARE) arrived at Hadar and camped there for two months during which the first hominin fossil was found. (Taieb claims in his 1985 book Sur la Terre des premiers Hommes to have discovered the Hadar fields in 1968, but Kalb argues that claim to be incorrect.) The IARE party examined a series of sedimentary layers called the Hadar Formation, which was dated to the late Pliocene to early Pleistocene epochs (3.5 to 2.3 million years ago).

The anthropologist Donald Johanson, a member of the 1973 expedition to Hadar, returned the next year and discovered the fossil hominin "Lucy" in the late fall of 1974. He spotted a right proximal ulna in a gully, followed by an occipital bone, a femur, some ribs, a pelvis, and a lower jaw. Within two weeks, nearly 40% of the hominoid skeleton had been identified and cataloged. Lucy is the most famous fossil to have been found at Hadar. Lucy is among the oldest hominin fossils ever discovered and was later given the taxonomic classification Australopithecus afarensis. (The name 'Lucy' was inspired by the song "Lucy in the Sky with Diamonds" by The Beatles, which happened to be playing on the radio at base camp.)

In 1975, Donald Johanson made another discovery at a nearby site in Hadar: 216 specimens from approximately 17 individuals, most likely related and varying in age, called AL 333 (colloquially referred to as the "First Family").

About thirty years later in nearby Dikika, another Australopithecus afarensis fossil skeleton was found in a separate outcrop of the Hadar Formation across the Awash River from Hadar. The skeleton is of a three-year-old girl later named "Selam," which means peace in Amharic Ethiopian languages.

Specimens and inferences 
In 1973 and 1974 when the first anatomical discoveries were made, their size and shape pointed towards a variety of taxa, but further research has confirmed that only one hominin taxon is present here. The first find there was a fossil knee joint estimated to date from 3.4 million years ago. Since then, the Hadar research area has yielded 370 specimens of A. afarensis, one specimen of Homo, and 7571 additional vertebrate specimens.

The specimens recovered display a variety of different primitive cranial post features, which indicate A. afarensis is distinct from other species of Australopithecus: small cranial capacity, palate similar to African apes (parallel tooth rows, shallow, long from front to back, narrow from side to side), primitive occipital, basal cranium anatomy, high frequency of unicuspid third premolars, prognathic face, and primitive mandibular anatomy. Postcranially, the pelvis, knee, ankle, and foot indicate habitual, terrestrial bipedalism, but ape-like curved finger and foot bones are retained ancestral ape-like features.

Fossil content

Other specimens discovered from Hadar Formation contain a vast diversity of bovid species found in Africa. The bovids found in the formation included the Aepycerotini (Aepyceros), Alcelaphini (Damalborea and Parmularius), Antilopini (Gazella), Bovini (Ugandax and Pelorovis[?]), Caprini (Budorcas), Cephalophini, Hippotragini (Oryx), Neotragini (Raphicerus[?] and Madoqua), Reduncini (Kobus), and Tragelaphini (Tragelaphus). Artiodactyls outside the bovid family were present within the formation as well, namely the giraffids Giraffa and Sivatherium, Hippopotamus, and suids (Kolpochoerus, Notochoerus, and Nyanzachoerus). While a definitive list of carnivorans found within the Hadar Formation has yet to be compiled, confirmed genera that were found within the Hadar Formation include canids Canis and Nyctereutes, felids (Dinofelis, Leptailurus, Felis, Homotherium, and Panthera), hyaenids (Chasmaporthetes, Ikelohyaena, Crocuta, Hyaena, and cf. Pliocrocuta), herpestids (Herpestes and cf. Helogale), mustelids (Mellivora, Enhydriodon, and cf. Poecilogale), and the viverrid cf. Civettictis. Mammals within the formation outside the artiodactyl and carnivoran families include a bat (indeterminate), the leporid Lepus, the equid Eurygnathohippus, rhinoceroses (Ceratotherium and Diceros), old world primates (Parapapio, Theropithecus, and Cercopithecoides), proboscideans (the deinothere Deinotherium and elephants Elephas, Loxodonta, and Mammuthus), old world porcupines Hystrix and Xenohystrix, murid rodents (Gerbilliscus, Acomys, Golunda, Oenomys, Praomys, Saidomys, Millardia, and Mus), the spalacid Tachyoryctes, a squirrel indet., and an aardvark species. Taxons within other classes are present within the Hadar Formation as well, such as birds (Plectropterus, Balearica, Anhinga, and Struthio) and reptiles (Crocodylus, Python, Varanus, and Bitis).

Mammals

Artiodactyla

Bovidae 
 Aepyceros datoadeni 
 Beatragus vrbae
 Budorcas churcheri
 Damalops sp.
 Damalborea
 D. grayi
 D. elisabethae
 Gazella
 G. harmonae
 G. janenschi
 G. praethomsoni
 Hippotragini
 Praedamalis deturi
 Kobus
 K. hadarensis
 K. oricornus  
 Madoqua sp.
 Parmularius pachyceras
 Raphicerus sp.
 Tragelaphus
 T. lockwoodi 
 T. nakuae
 T. rastafari 
 Ugandax coryndonae

Giraffidae 
 Giraffa
 G. jumae
 G. stillei
 Sivatherium maurusium

Hippopotamidae 
 Hexaprotodon protoamphibius
 Hippopotamus afarensis

Suidae 
 Kolpochoerus afarensis
 Notochoerus eulius
 Nyanzachoerus
 N. kanamensis
 N. pattersoni

Carnivora

Canidae 
 Canis mesomelas
 Nyctereutes lockwoodi

Felidae 
 Dinofelis
 D. aronoki
 D. petteri
 Felis sp.
 Homotherium hadarensis
 Megantereon sp.
 Leptailurus sp.
 Panthera sp.

Herpestidae 
 Herpestes sp.

Hyaenidae 
 Chasmaporthetes sp.
 Crocuta
C. dietrichi 
C. eturono
 Hyaena sp.
 Ikelohyaena abronia
 Pachycrocuta cf. perierri

Mustelidae 
 Enhydriodon dikikae
 Lutra hearsti
 Mellivora sp.
 Poecilogale sp.

Proboscidea

Deinotheriidae 
 Deinotherium bozasi

Elephantidae 
 Elephas ekorensis
 Loxodonta
 L. adaurora
 L. exoptata
 Mammuthus sp.
 Palaeoloxodon recki brumpti

Perissodactyla

Equidae 
 Hipparion sp.
 Eurygnathohippus afarense

Rhinocerotidae 
 Diceros bicornis
 Ceratotherium simum

Primates

Cercopithecidae 
 Cercopithecoides meaveae
 Parapapio jonesi
 Rhinocolobus turkanaensis
 Theropithecus
 T. darti
  T. oswaldi

Hominidae 
 Australopithecus afarensis

Rodentia 
 Acomys indet.
 Gerbilliscus sp.
 Golunda  indet.  
 Millardia coppensi
 Hystrix sp.
 Mus indet.
 Oenomys indet.
 Xenohystrix indet.
 Praomys indet.
 Saidomys indet.
 Thryonomys swinderianus .
 Xerus sp.

Birds 
 Anhinga sp.
 Balearica sp.
 Plectropterus sp. 
 Struthio sp.

Reptiles 
 Bitis sp.
 Crocodylus sp.
 Python sp.
 Varanus sp.

See also
 Ledi-Geraru

References

External links
 Photo gallery from a University of Washington archaeological field season

Archaeological sites in Ethiopia
Pliocene paleontological sites of Africa
Afar Region
Archaeological sites of Eastern Africa